Sorkhi may refer to:
 Sorkhi, Isfahan
 Sorkhi, Razavi Khorasan